AnadoluJet is a brand of Turkish Airlines operating as a regional airline. It operates domestic flights as well as flights to Northern Cyprus, Western Europe and Western Asia for its parent company.

History
The brand was created on 23 April 2008 by Turkish Airlines. In March 2020, the brand was reconfigured to apply to the entire Turkish Airlines international route network operating from Istanbul Sabiha Gökçen International Airport, consisting of over 20 routes.

In February 2023, Turkish Airlines confirmed plans to spin-off AnadoluJet from an incorporated brand name into an independent airline.

Destinations

AnadoluJet operates flights to domestic destinations and international destinations in several countries including the following:

Codeshare agreements
AnadoluJet additionally maintains codeshare agreements with parent company Turkish Airlines.

Fleet

Current fleet

, AnadoluJet operates a fleet of 68 narrow-body aircraft.

Previous fleet
AnadoluJet has operated the following aircraft:
Airbus A320-200
ATR 72-500
Boeing 737-400
Boeing 737-700
Embraer E190
Embraer E195

References

External links

Official website

2008 establishments in Turkey
Turkish brands
Airlines established in 2008
Airlines of Turkey
Companies based in Ankara
Low-cost carriers
Turkish Airlines